Robert James Nicol (born 28 May 1983 in Auckland) is a former New Zealand cricketer, who played all formats of the game. He is a right-handed opening batsman and bowled right arm off spin occasionally. Domestically, Nicol has played first-class, List A and Twenty20 matches for Auckland and Canterbury, and was the captain for Auckland. In June 2018, Nicol announced his retirement from all forms of cricket.

Domestic career
Rob Nicol started off playing for Auckland and played for the Aces for 8 seasons his best spell in 2002–03 where he scored over 600 runs. He then moved to Canterbury in 2009, scoring over 500 runs in his first season. His performances for the Wizards brought him to the notice of the New Zealand selectors, who selected him for the Twenty20 squad.

Previously played at Hitchin Cricket Club in Hertfordshire as the overseas player in 2009 and 2010 before joining up with the Kiwis in West Indies. Broke the Saracens Hertfordshire Division 1 total season runs and largest innings at 201 not out against Knebworth Park CC.

Nicol enjoyed a spell in English county cricket playing for Gloucestershire in July 2012 as a replacement for fellow countryman Kane Williamson as part of the deal Gloucestershire coach John Bracewell set up with the New Zealand Cricket Board where young Kiwi cricketers join Gloucs for experience.

International career
He made his debut in one day internationals in 2011, but failed to secure regular selection past the 2012/2013 season. Selectors rewarded him with a place in the test team in the home series against South Africa, but he found runs difficult to come by and has only played 2 Tests to date. He was also played as the opening partner of Brendon McCullum during 2012 ICC World Twenty20 held in Sri Lanka.

Nicol had a wonderful ODI debut against Zimbabwe in 2011 at Harare. Chasing 232 to win, the New Zealand openers Nicol and Martin Guptill first sent the Black Caps to a flyer as they crossed 50 runs in just 6 overs. After that, he went on to score 108 not out, a brilliant century that included 11 fours. In the process, he became the seventh batsman ever and the second New Zealander (after his fellow opener in the match, Martin Guptill) to score a century on ODI debut. The previous batsmen to achieve this feat were Dennis Amiss, Desmond Haynes, Andy Flower, Saleem Elahi, Martin Guptill, and Colin Ingram. He was acknowledged the man of the match for his debut century, thus becoming the 50th player to be named Man of the Match on ODI debut.

See also
 List of Auckland representative cricketers

References

External links
 Cricinfo profile

1983 births
Living people
New Zealand cricketers
New Zealand Test cricketers
New Zealand One Day International cricketers
New Zealand Twenty20 International cricketers
Auckland cricketers
Canterbury cricketers
Gloucestershire cricketers
Mashonaland cricketers
Otago cricketers
Cricketers who made a century on One Day International debut